The Teskey Brothers are an Australian blues rock band from Melbourne, named after the two brothers who formed the group in 2008: Josh Teskey (vocals, rhythm guitar) and Sam Teskey (lead guitar). In 2019 they signed with Glassnote Records and Ivy League Records. They have released two albums, Half Mile Harvest (2017) and Run Home Slow (2019), and a third, titled The Winding Way (2023). At the 2019 ARIA Music Awards, The Teskey Brothers were nominated for seven awards. They won three categories for the album, Run Home Slow, Best Group, Best Blues and Roots Album and Engineer of the Year (Sam Teskey).

Career 
The band was formed in 2008 by two brothers, Josh Teskey (vocals) and Sam Teskey (guitar), along with Brendon Love (bass) and Liam Gough (drums). They started by playing in the streets and at parties, then playing larger venues. They were soon attracting attention from record labels. The band began to experience success in 2017. On 12 January 2017, The Teskey Brothers released their debut album, Half Mile Harvest, which was produced in their home studio. Half Mile Harvest was in the Top 20 of the ARIA charts and eventually became number one on the ARIA Independent Album charts.

In 2018, they signed a deal with Downtown Music Publishing. In 2019, the band signed with Glassnote Records, Ivy League Records, and Mushroom Music Publishing. In July 2019 won the Levi Music Prize; a prize to financially assist Australian and New Zealand acts to achieve their export goals. The band contributed seven songs for the 2019 Palm Beach soundtrack which was released in July 2019. On 2 August 2019, The Teskey Brothers released their second studio album, Run Home Slow which debuted at number 2 on the ARIA Charts. The album won Engineer of the Year for Sam at the ARIA Music Awards of 2019. The album also won the ARIA Award for Best Group and Best Blues and Roots album. In 2022, "Carry You", a song from the album, was certified Gold by ARIA.

In April 2020, the band announced the release of their first live album, titled Live at the Forum, released on 15 May 2020.

In April 2021, the band released a cover of INXS' "Never Tear Us Apart" in dedication to Michael Gudinski.

In October 2021, the band announced the release of Live at Hamer Hall, an album recorded in December 2020 and set for release in December 2021.

On the 28 November, 2022, it was announced that bassist Brendon Love and drummer Liam Gough would be departing the band, resulting in the band establishing itself as a duo. 

In January 2022, the band released a cover of Archie Roach's "Get back to the Land" with Emma Donovan.

In early 2023, The Teskey Brothers announced their third studio album, The Winding Way, for a release on the 16 June 2023. The album has been preceded by the singles ""This Will Be Our Year" and "Oceans and Emotions".

Style 
Their music is in the style of Wilson Pickett, and Otis Redding. The band plays soul music, with jazz and rhythm and blues influence.

Discography

Studio albums

Live albums

Extended plays

Singles

Notes

Other charted and certified songs

Awards and nominations

AIR Awards
The Australian Independent Record Awards (commonly known informally as AIR Awards) is an annual awards night to recognise, promote and celebrate the success of Australia's Independent Music sector.

! 
|-
| 2018
|Half Mile Harvest 
| Best Independent Blues and Roots Album
| 
| 
|-
| rowspan="2" | 2020
| rowspan="2" | Run Home Slow 
| Independent Album of the Year
| 
| rowspan="2" | 
|-
| Best Independent Blues and Roots Album or EP
| 
|-
| 2021
| Live at the Forum
| Best Independent Blues and Roots Album or EP
| 
| 
|-
| 2022
| Live at Hamer Hall (with Orchestra Victoria)
| Best Independent Blues and Roots Album or EP
|  
|

APRA Awards
The APRA Awards are held in Australia and New Zealand by the Australasian Performing Right Association to recognise songwriting skills, sales and airplay performance by its members annually. The Teskey Brothers have been nominated for three awards.

! 
|-
| 2019 
| "Forever You and Me" 
| Song of the Year
| 
| 
|-
| rowspan="3"| 2020
| rowspan="2"| "I Get Up"
| Song of the Year
| 
| rowspan="3"|
|-
| Most Performed Blues & Roots Work of the Year
| 
|-
| Themselves
| Breakthrough Songwriter of the Year
| 
|-
| rowspan="2"| 2021
| "Ain't My Problem" (with Ash Grunwald)
| Most Performed Blues & Roots Work
| 
| rowspan="2"|
|-
| "Rain"
| Most Performed R&B / Soul Work
| 
|-

ARIA Music Awards
The ARIA Music Awards is an annual awards ceremony that recognises excellence, innovation, and achievement across all genres of Australian music. The Teskey Brothers have been nominated for eleven awards and have won four.

! 
|-
| rowspan="7"| 2019
| rowspan="5"| Run Home Slow
| Album of the Year
| 
| rowspan="7"|
|-
| Best Group
| 
|-
| Best Blues & Roots Album
| 
|-
| Breakthrough Artist
| 
|-
| Best Independent Release
| 
|-
| The Teskey Brothers - Intimate Venue Tour
| Best Australian Live Act
| 
|-
| Sam Teskey for The Teskey Brothers – Run Home Slow
| Engineer of the Year
| 
|-
| rowspan="3"| 2020
| rowspan="2"| Live at the Forum
| Best Group
| 
| rowspan="3"| 
|-
| Best Blues & Roots Album
| 
|-
| Run Home Slow
| Best Australian Live Act
| 
|-
| 2021  
| The Teskey Brothers (Headline Shows + Festivals)
| Best Australian Live Act
| 
| 
|-
| 2022
| Live At Hamer Hall (with Orchestra Victoria)
| ARIA Award for Best Blues and Roots Album
| 
| 
|-

J Award
The J Awards are an annual series of Australian music awards that were established by the Australian Broadcasting Corporation's youth-focused radio station Triple J. They commenced in 2005.

|-
| J Awards of 2019
| themselves
| Double J Act of the Year
| 
|-

Music Victoria Awards
The Music Victoria Awards, are an annual awards night celebrating Victorian music. They commenced in 2005.

|-
| rowspan="3"| 2017
| themselves
| Best Emerging Act
| 
|-
| themselves
| Best Band
| 
|-
| themselves| Half Mile Harvest
| Best Soul, Funk, R'n'B and Gospel Album
| 
|-
| rowspan="5"| 2019
| rowspan="2"| Run Home Slow
| Best Album
| 
|-
| Best Folk or Roots Album
| 
|-
| "So Caught Up"
| Best Song
| 
|-
| rowspan="2"| Themselves
| Best Band
| 
|-
| Best Regional/Outer Suburban Act
| 
|-
| rowspan="4"| 2020
| rowspan="2"| themselves
| Best Live Act
| 
|-
| Best Regional/Outer Suburban Act
| 
|-
| rowspan="2"| Live at The Forum
| Best Blues and Roots Album
| 
|-
| Best Soul, Funk, R'n'B and Gospel Album
| 
|-
| 2021
| themselves
| Best Regional/Outer Suburban Act
| 
|-

National Live Music Awards
The National Live Music Awards (NLMAs) are a broad recognition of Australia's diverse live industry, celebrating the success of the Australian live scene. The awards commenced in 2016.

|-
| rowspan="2"| National Live Music Awards of 2019
| rowspan="2"| The Teskey Brothers
| Live Blues and Roots Act of the Year
| 
|-
| International Live Achievement (Group)
| 
|-

References

External links
 
 

2008 establishments in Australia
APRA Award winners
ARIA Award winners
Australian blues rock groups
Ivy League Records artists
Musical groups established in 2008
Musical groups from Melbourne
Musical quartets
Sibling musical groups